Garzhal may refer to:
 Garzhal-e Olya
 Garzhal-e Sofla